Jens Lundgaard (13 July 1911 – 4 August 1997) was a Danish footballer. He played in one match for the Denmark national football team in 1937.

References

External links
 

1911 births
1997 deaths
Danish men's footballers
Denmark international footballers
Place of birth missing
Association footballers not categorized by position